The Pakistan Korfball Federation (PKF) is the national sports governing body to develop and promote sport of Korfball in Pakistan.

The federation is affiliated with International Korfball Federation

See also
 Pakistan national korfball team

References

Sports governing bodies in Pakistan
Korfball in Pakistan
Korfball governing bodies